Begum Tahira Bukhari is a Pakistani politician who has been a member of the National Assembly of Pakistan, since August 2018. Previously she was a member of the National Assembly from June 2013 to May 2018.

Political career

She quit Pakistan Muslim League (N) (PML-N) and join Pakistan Muslim League (Q) (PML-Q) during President Pervez Musharraf rule however rejoined PML-N in 2012.

She was elected to the National Assembly of Pakistan as a candidate of PML-N on a reserved seat for women from Khyber Paktunkhwa in 2013 Pakistani general election.

She was re-elected to the National Assembly as a candidate of PML-N on a reserved seat for women from Khyber Paktunkhwa in 2018 Pakistani general election.

References

Living people
Pakistan Muslim League (N) MNAs
Pakistani MNAs 2013–2018
Women members of the National Assembly of Pakistan
Year of birth missing (living people)
Pakistani MNAs 2018–2023
21st-century Pakistani women politicians